Steindolptoppen is a mountain in Nathorst Land at Spitsbergen, Svalbard. It has a height of 1,035 m.a.s.l. Nearby mountains are Langlifjellet, Juvtinden and Rånekampen. At the eastern side of Steindolptoppen is the glacier of Steindolpbreen.

References

Mountains of Spitsbergen